Sasa is an arcade video game released for the MSX1 in 1984, and later for the Family Computer as  in 1985.

This video game involved obtaining capsules with an 'E' on them, sometimes suspended by balloons. The main character could only use bullets to propel himself, and when the bullet count reaches 0, the game ends. A player can also lose bullets by colliding with an enemy, the other player, or the other player's bullets.

External links
 

1984 video games
ASCII Corporation games
Japan-exclusive video games
MSX games
Nintendo Entertainment System games
Scrolling shooters
Video games developed in Japan